Hugh McHardy was a Scottish footballer who played as a left back.

Career
McHardy played club football for Rangers and St Mirren, and made one appearance for Scotland in 1885.

References

Year of birth missing
Place of birth missing
Scottish footballers
Scotland international footballers
Rangers F.C. players
St Mirren F.C. players
Association football fullbacks
Year of death missing
Place of death missing